Eukaryotic translation elongation factor 1 beta 2 pseudogene 1 (eEF1B1) is a protein that in humans is encoded by the EEF1B2P1 gene.

See also 
eEF-1

References